Arapahoe County may refer to:

Arapahoe County, Colorado
Arapahoe County, Kansas Territory, a large county that included the entire western portion of the territory.